Benzylbutylbarbiturate (5-benzyl-5-n-butylbarbituric acid) is a rare example of a barbiturate designer drug, possibly the only such compound encountered in recent years.

It was confiscated by police in Japan in 2000, and presumably was a product of clandestine manufacture as this compound has never previously been sold as a legal pharmaceutical. As with all designer drugs, this compound was produced in an attempt to circumvent drug laws prohibiting the use of most known barbiturate drugs, however as the drug laws in many jurisdictions (including Japan) prohibit "any 5,5-disubstituted derivative of barbituric acid", this compound was deemed to be already illegal, despite being a novel compound which had not previously been encountered.

This compound was known from the scientific literature and so was not a new chemical entity.

References 

Barbiturates
Designer drugs
GABAA receptor positive allosteric modulators
Benzyl compounds